The Odisha State Film Awards  have been conferred  by   the Department of Culture of the Government of Odisha, India.

The awards were initiated in 1968.  The awards are decided by independent juries formed by the Department of Culture. The jury usually consists of eminent personalities from the film fraternity, academician, journalist and public servants.

Lists of awardees

Jaydev Award 
“The Jayadev Award” is a special award given to a film personality for outstanding contribution to the growth and development of Odia cinema.

Odisha State Film Award for Best Film

Odisha State Film Award for Best Documentary

Odisha State Film Award for Best Director

Odisha State Film Award for Best Actor

Odisha State Film Award for Best supporting Actor

Odisha State Film Award for Best Actress

Odisha State Film Award for Best supporting Actress

Odisha State Film Award for Best Comedian

Odisha State Film Award for Best Child Artist

Odisha State Film Award for Best Photography

Odisha State Film Award for Best Story

Odisha State Film Award for Best Screen Play

Odisha State Film Award for Best Dialogue

Odisha State Film Award for Best Lyrics

Odisha State Film Award for Best Music Director

Odisha State Film Award for Best Singer

Odisha State Film Award for Best Editor

Odisha State Film Award for Best Art Director

Odisha State Film Award for Best Sound Recordist

Odisha State Film Award for Best Costumes

Odisha State Film Award for Best Makeup artist

Odisha State Film Award (Special Jury Award)

See also
Cinema of Odisha
 Filmfare Awards East

References

External links

 

 
Cinema of Odisha
1973 establishments in Orissa
Awards established in 1973